Peperomia turboensis is a species of plant in the genus Peperomia of the family Piperaceae. It is native to Colombia, growing as a subshrub primarily in wet tropical areas.

References

turboensis
Flora of Colombia